The Axel Springer Award is an annual award given to outstanding personalities who are "exceptionally innovative, create new markets and change markets, shape culture, and face up to their social responsibility". The award, which does not involve a cash prize, was presented for the first time in 2016. The award winners are selected by the Executive Board of the publishing house Axel Springer SE.

Laureates 

 2016: Mark Zuckerberg
 2017: Timothy Berners-Lee
 2018: Jeff Bezos
 2019: Shoshana Zuboff
 2020: Elon Musk
 2021: Uğur Şahin and Özlem Türeci
 2022: Volodymyr Zelenskyy

References

External links 
 

Axel Springer Award
Awards established in 2016
2016 establishments in Germany